Mentally is a 2017 Nigerian film written, produced and directed by James Abinibi. The movie stars Kunle Idowu, Toyin Abraham, Woli Arole and Adekunle Gold

Synopsis 
The movie revolves around a young man who went to Lagos, a place where he only knows one person, in search of greener pastures despite his mother's warning.

Premiere 
The movie was first premiered on Sunday 29 September 2017.

Cast 

 Toyin Abraham,
 Yaw;
 Adekunle Gold;
 Jude Chukwuka;
 Woli Arole;
 Senator Comedian;
 Sunkanmi Omobolanle;
 Erick Didie;
 Soma;
 Wale Waves; and
 Koloman Prosper.

References 

2017 films
Nigerian drama films
English-language Nigerian films